Kirungu is a town located in the Democratic Republic of the Congo in  Tanganyika province. It is inland from Moba port, the administrative center of Moba Territory.

Kirungu was formerly called Baudouinville (or Boudewijnstad in Dutch), and was the site of a White Fathers mission founded in 1893 by Father Victor Roelens.
The Roman Catholic Diocese of Kalemie–Kirungu is based in Kirunga and Kalemie,  to the north.

Geography
The town lies along National Highway 34 which connects it to the jetty in Moba and to the north-south running National Highway 5 in the west.

Kirungu lies just south of the Mulobozi river. The Marungu highlands, a range of steep rugged hills, rises behind the town, bisected by the Mulobozi.

Notable landmarks
The town contains the Stade du Kirungu, the Radio Communautaire de Moba headquarters and the Hopital de Reference Kirungu.

References

Populated places in Tanganyika Province